José María Arguedas is a Peruvian football club, located in the city of Andahuaylas, Apurímac, Peru.

History
The club was founded with the name of club José María Arguedas in honor to the Peruvian writer José María Arguedas.

In the 2009 Copa Perú, the club classified to National Stage but was eliminated by Unión Alfonso Ugarte of Tacna.

Honours

Regional
Región VIII:
Winners (1): 2009

Liga Departamental de Apurímac:
Winners (7): 2004, 2005, 2007, 2009, 2010, 2016, 2017
 Runner-up (3): 2011, 2012, 2013

Liga Provincial de Andahuaylas:
Winners (2): 2009, 2013, 2016
 Runner-up (1): 2017

Liga Distrital de Andahuaylas:
Winners (2): 2009, 2013
 Runner-up (4): 2015, 2016, 2019, 2022

See also
List of football clubs in Peru
Peruvian football league system

External links
 Los 16 expedientes

Football clubs in Peru